The 2013 German Open Grand Prix Gold was the first grand prix gold and grand prix tournament of the 2013 BWF Grand Prix Gold and Grand Prix. The tournament was held in RWE-Sporthalle, Mulheim an der Ruhr, Germany from February 26 until March 3, 2013 and had a total purse of $120,000.

Men's singles

Seeds

  Chen Long (champion)
  Boonsak Ponsana (semi-final)
  Sho Sasaki (third round)
  Wong Wing Ki (quarter-final)
  Marc Zwiebler (quarter-final)
  Viktor Axelsen (second round)
  Takuma Ueda (third round)
  Tommy Sugiarto (final)
  Chou Tien-chen (third round)
  Ajay Jayaram (third round)
  Gao Huan (withdrew)
  Rajiv Ouseph (quarter-final)
  Tan Chun Seang (first round)
  Tanongsak Saensomboonsuk (third round)
  Rajah Menuri Venkata Gurusaidutt (first round)
  Niluka Karunaratne (third round)

Finals

Top half

Section 1

Section 2

Section 3

Section 4

Bottom half

Section 5

Section 6

Section 7

Section 8

Women's singles

Seeds

  Li Xuerui (quarter-final)
  Wang Yihan (champion)
  Juliane Schenk (final)
  Sung Ji-hyun (semi-final)
  Tai Tzu-ying (quarter-final)
  Minatsu Mitani (withdrew)
  Porntip Buranaprasertsuk (first round)
  Eriko Hirose (second round)

Finals

Top half

Section 1

Section 2

Bottom half

Section 3

Section 4

Men's doubles

Seeds

  Ko Sung-hyun / Lee Yong-dae (quarter-final)
  Hiroyuki Endo / Kenichi Hayakawa (quarter-final)
  Kim Ki-jung / Kim Sa-rang (semi-final)
  Hirokatsu Hashimoto / Noriyasu Hirata (first round)
  Vladimir Ivanov / Ivan Sozonov (withdrew)
  Chai Biao / Hong Wei (champion)
  Liu Xiaolong / Qiu Zihan (final)
  Ingo Kindervater / Johannes Schoettler (quarter-final)

Finals

Top half

Section 1

Section 2

Bottom half

Section 3

Section 4

Women's doubles

Seeds

  Misaki Matsutomo / Ayaka Takahashi (semi-final)
  Eom Hye-won / Jang Ye-na (semi-final)
  Miyuki Maeda / Satoko Suetsuna (withdrew)
  Jung Kyung-eun / Kim Ha-na (champion)
  Ma Jin / Tang Jinhua (final)
  Duanganong Aroonkesorn / Kunchala Voravichitchaikul (first round)
  Poon Lok Yan / Tse Ying Suet (second round)
  Valeria Sorokina / Nina Vislova (withdrew)

Finals

Top half

Section 1

Section 2

Bottom half

Section 3

Section 4

Mixed doubles

Seeds

  Chan Peng Soon / Goh Liu Ying (first round)
  Robert Mateusiak / Nadiezda Zieba (semi-final)
  Danny Bawa Chrisnanta / Vannesa Neo Yu Yan (second round)
  Fran Kurniawan / Shendy Puspa Irawati (quarter-final)
  Riky Widianto / Richi Puspita Dili (first round)
  Michael Fuchs / Birgit Michels (second round)
  Mads Pieler Kolding / Kamilla Rytter Juhl (first round)
  Kenichi Hayakawa / Misaki Matsutomo (quarter-final)

Finals

Top half

Section 1

Section 2

Bottom half

Section 3

Section 4

References

German Open (badminton)
German Open
Open
Sport in Mülheim
BWF Grand Prix Gold and Grand Prix